Guangyang District is a district of Langfang, Hebei, China.

Administrative divisions
Subdistricts:
North Yinhe Road Subdistrict, East Aimin Street Subdistrict, Jiefang Street Subdistrict, Xinkai Road Subdistrict, Xinyuan Street Subdistrict

Towns:
Nanjianta, Wanzhuang, Jiuzhou

The only township is Beiwang Township

References

External links

 
County-level divisions of Hebei
Langfang